Escaping Your Ambitions is the second studio album by The Tough Alliance, released in 2006. There were only 1000 copies released, half of which were on vinyl.

Track listing
"Setting Sail" – 1:07
"Leg 1" – 1:26
"Leg 2" - 5:31
"Leg 3" - 3:18
"Leg 4" - 3:19
"Leg 5" - 4:20
"Echoes Of A Wreck" – 1:08
"Leg 6" – 2:46
"Leg 7" – 2:37
"Leg 8" – 3:07
"Leg 9" – 7:36
"The Lagoon" – 0:49

References

External links
The Tough Alliance Homepage 
Sincerely Yours

2006 albums
The Tough Alliance albums